AATT may refer to:
Airports Authority of Trinidad and Tobago - a government agency
And Also the Trees - an English Rock band
Argentine Association of Technical-Scientific Translators